Sandy Point is an unincorporated village in the town of Stockton Springs, Waldo County, Maine, United States. Sandy Point has a post office with ZIP code 04972, which opened on January 1, 1795.

References

Villages in Waldo County, Maine
Villages in Maine